Ljeljenča is a village located west of the municipality of Bijeljina in Republika Srpska, Bosnia and Herzegovina. According to the results of the 2013 Bosnian census, it has 976 inhabitants.

External links
 Bijeljina Danas (Serbian)  

Bijeljina
Populated places in Bijeljina